Edna B. DeVries is an American politician from Alaska and the incumbent Matanuska-Susitna Borough mayor. DeVries served in the Alaska Senate as a member of the 14th State Legislature. A realtor and resident of Palmer, Alaska, she previously served as that municipality's mayor.

References

1941 births
Living people
University of Alaska Anchorage alumni
Republican Party Alaska state senators
People from Palmer, Alaska